The Waupacksee is a lake on the southeastern edge of the town of  Waren (Müritz) in the district of Mecklenburgische Seenplatte in the German state of Mecklenburg-Western Pomerania. Its only headstream is a ditch from the meadows to the north, a ditch also carries its waters away to the Feisneck which in turn empties into the Müritz. The lake is mostly surrounded by meadows, only the eastern shore has a row of bushes. The shore is covered in reeds so the only access to the lake is from private land on the western shore. A high-tension power line crosses the northern part of the lake.

References 

Lakes of Mecklenburg-Western Pomerania
Mecklenburgische Seenplatte (district)
LWaupacksee
Waren (Müritz)